Welsh may refer to:

Related to Wales
 Welsh, referring or related to Wales
 Welsh language, a Brittonic Celtic language spoken in Wales
 Welsh people

People
 Welsh (surname)
 Sometimes used as a synonym for the ancient Britons (Celtic people)

Animals
 Welsh (pig)

Places
 Welsh Basin, a basin during the Cambrian, Ordovician and Silurian geological periods
 Welsh, Louisiana, a town in the United States
 Welsh, Ohio, an unincorporated community in the United States

See also
 Welch (disambiguation)
 
 
 Cambrian + Cymru

Language and nationality disambiguation pages